John Carden (May 10, 1931 - September 7, 1997) was a member of the U.S. soccer team at the 1956 Summer Olympics.

Carden, a graduate of the University of Southern California, did not enter the lone U.S. game of the tournament, a 9–1 loss to Yugoslavia. At the time, he was a private in the United States Army assigned to Fort McPherson.

References

Living people
American military Olympians
American soccer players
Olympic soccer players of the United States
University of Southern California alumni
Footballers at the 1956 Summer Olympics
Association football midfielders
United States Army soldiers
1931 births